Constantius Bridge is a modern concrete bridge across the River Tyne about  north west of Hexham, Northumberland, England. The bridge carries the A69 road over the River Tyne and forms part of the Hexham bypass. It is the last crossing of the River Tyne before it splits into the North Tyne and South Tyne.

History
In 1976 a new road was built to replace the old A69 through Hexham, and Hexham was by-passed on the north side of the river, necessitating a bridge crossing near Warden just west of Hexham. The bridge crosses the River Tyne just downstream from the "Meeting of the Waters" – the point where the North and South Tyne rivers join to form the main River Tyne, then crosses the railway to continue towards Haydon Bridge.

On 30 August 1975, during construction, there was a flood, and the scaffolding and shuttering for the westernmost span collapsed. The completed bridge has already required strengthening due to flood damage, showing that the Tyne has lost none of its capability for attacking bridge structures.

References

External links

Bridges in Northumberland
Crossings of the River Tyne